Vyacheslav Leonidovych Checher (born 15 December 1980) is a Ukrainian retired professional football defender.

International career
Checher made his debut for Ukraine on 18 February 2004 in an away draw with Libya (1:1). He replaced Serhiy Symonenko on 62nd minute.

References

External links
 
 

1980 births
Living people
Sportspeople from Mykolaiv
Ukrainian footballers
Ukraine international footballers
Ukrainian Premier League players
Ukrainian Second League players
FC Kryvbas Kryvyi Rih players
FC Metalurh Donetsk players
FC Kryvbas-2 Kryvyi Rih players
FC Metalurh-2 Donetsk players
FC Karpaty Lviv players
Association football defenders
FC Zorya Luhansk players
Ukrainian football managers